Sihi is a village panchayat, or village counsel, located in the Gurugram district of Haryana state, India. The village is dominated by dalits. It lies on main Northern Peripheral Road also known as Dwarka expressway.

Nearest places
The nearest railway station to Sihi is Garhi Harsaru, which is a  distance.

History
Sihi is about 400 years old village. Before the Partition in 1947, Sihi was controlled by the Pathans who migrated from Afghanistan about 400 years ago. There were also some Hindus living there but they didn't have the right to sell any property in the village. After partition all the Muslims were compelled to leave the village and eventually almost all the living Muslims migrated to Pakistan and are mainly living in Karachi.

See also
 Gurgaon
 Haryana

References 

Villages in Gurgaon district